is a passenger railway station in located in the town of Toyosato,  Shiga Prefecture, Japan, operated by the private railway operator Ohmi Railway.

Lines
Toyosato Station is served by the Ohmi Railway Main Line, and is located 15.0 rail kilometers from the terminus of the line at Maibara Station.

Station layout
The station consists of two unnumbered side platforms connected to the station building by a level crossing. The station is unattended.

Platforms

Adjacent stations

History
Toyosato Station was opened as a temporary stop on March 19, 1899 on land donated by local magnate Itō Chūbei. A station building was completed on April 14, 1906 and the station raised to a passenger station on the Ohmi Railway. Cargo handling was abolished in October 1972. The station building was reconstructed in 1996.

Surroundings
Toyosato Town Hall
Toyosato Elementary School, known for being used in the anime K-On!
Nakasendō
Tōkaidō Shinkansen

See also
List of railway stations in Japan

References

External links

 Ohmi Railway official site

Railway stations in Shiga Prefecture
Railway stations in Japan opened in 1899
Toyosato, Shiga